Omar Al-Safadi (born 4 September 1994) is a Qatari handball player for Al-Rayan and the Qatari national team.

He participated at the 2017 World Men's Handball Championship.

References

1994 births
Living people
Qatari male handball players